Yuping Dong Autonomous County is an autonomous county under the administration of the prefecture-level city of Tongren, in the east of Guizhou Province, China, bordering Hunan Province to the southeast.

Area: .

Population:  in 2002.

Postal Code: 554000.

The county government is located in Pingxi town.

The county produces a special instrument "Yuping Flute".

Climate

References

External links
Official website of Yuping Government

County-level divisions of Guizhou
Kam autonomous counties